Attenborougharion rubicundus is a species of air-breathing semi-slug, terrestrial pulmonate gastropod molluscs in the family Helicarionidae.

It has been referred to as the "burgundy snail", but should not to be confused with Helix pomatia, which is also known by that name.

Taxonomy
This species was described under the name Helicarion rubicundus in 1978. The species was reassigned from genus Helicarion to Attenborougharion its own monotypic genus, named after David Attenborough, in 2017 by researchers at the Australian Museum. 
The description of this genus was formally published on 9 August 2017.

Distribution
This species is endemic to Australia, and is known only from the Forestier Peninsula and a small portion of the Tasman Peninsula on the island of Tasmania.

Description
These semi-slugs are about 27.5–45 mm in length and are bright green and bright red.

See also
 List of things named after David Attenborough and his works

References

External links
 Otley H.M. (1999). Survey report for the burgundy snail (Helicarion rubicundus) on the Forestier and Tasman Peninsulas. Report to Forestry Tasmania. source list 23 April 2008
 Taylor R.J. (1991). "Distribution and habitat of Helicarion rubicundus (Pulmonata: Helicarionidae), a rare land snail". Papers and Proceedings of the Royal Society of Tasmania 125: 27-28. source list 23 April 2008

Helicarionidae
Gastropods described in 1978
Taxonomy articles created by Polbot
Taxobox binomials not recognized by IUCN